Michael Johnson (born January 27, 1941 in Los Angeles) is an American sprint canoer who competed in the late 1970s. At the 1976 Summer Olympics in Montreal, he was eliminated in the repechages of the K-2 500 m event.

References
Sports-reference.com profile

1941 births
Sportspeople from Los Angeles
American male canoeists
Canoeists at the 1976 Summer Olympics
Living people
Olympic canoeists of the United States